Robert Sylvester Okojie is a Nigerian-American engineer.

Early life and education 
Robert Okojie was born in Barkin-Ladi, Plateau State, Nigeria, to Juliana Omakhamen Okojie (nee Odigie) and Prince Francis A. Okojie, from the Royal family of King Ogbidi Okojie (1857-1944) of Uromi who was a ruler of the Esan people in what is now Edo State, Nigeria

After graduation from Ibadan Boys' High School (1980) in Oyo State, Nigeria, Okojie traveled to the United States to attend college in 1986. He attended the New Jersey Institute of Technology in Newark, where he obtained his bachelor's (1991) and Master’s (1993) in electrical engineering respectively. He further earned his PhD in 1996.

Career 
Okojie joined the silicon carbide research group at NASA’s Glenn Research Center in Cleveland in 1999. He holds over 20 patents relating to high-temperature devices, including several licenses for commercial use that could reduce spacecraft weight, and thereby launch cost and fuel consumption, while leaving additional space for scientific payloads.

He demonstrated the world’s first thermally stable ohmic contact metallization on silicon carbide at record-breaking temperatures for extended periods of time. Paving way for high temperature sensors and electronics at these temperatures that can substantially improve safety and efficiency, as well as directly impacting the air quality around airports.

He equally developed the first accelerated stress test protocol published in the IEEE international Reliability Physics Symposium.

Awards and recognitions 
Okojie has received accolades, including in 2009 the NASA Abe Silverstein Medal for Research and in 2012 the Glenn Research  Distinguished Publication Award. Scientist of the Year by the National Technical Association for advancing the state-of-the-art of MEMS for use in harsh environments and in 2007 was a recipient of the Cleveland Executive Board Wings of Excellence award.

On November 22, 2020, he was inducted into NASA Inventors Hall of Fame, making him the 35th recipient of the prestigious honor and just the fourth African Black person to be inducted.

References

External links 
 https://nari,arc.nasa.gov/okojie

1960 births
Living people
Nigerian scientists
New Jersey Institute of Technology alumni